Solingen Mitte station is in the city of Solingen in the German state of North Rhine-Westphalia. It is on the Wuppertal-Oberbarmen–Solingen railway. The line through the site of Solingen Mitte station was opened on 2 December 1890 as part of the Solingen–Wuppertal-Vohwinkel line, known as the Korkenzieherbahn ("Corkscrew Railway"), to Vohwinkel. The station was opened on 10 December 2006. It is classified by Deutsche Bahn as a category 5 station.

The station is served by line S 7 of the Rhine-Ruhr S-Bahn, branded as Der Müngstener, operated every 20 minutes from Monday to Friday and generally every half hour on weekends and at off-peak times, using (LINT 41) vehicles. Until 15 December 1913 the station was served by Regional-Express service RB 47, operated by DB Regio NRW, normally with two-carriage sets of class 628.4. The Abellio Deutschland company won a contract that was put to tender in November 2010 and took over the operation of passenger services on the route from December 2013 for a period of 15 years.

Since December of 2022, the Station is also served hourly by regional service RE 47 between Düsseldorf Hauptbahnhof and Remscheid-Lennep, operated by Regiobahn.

References

Rhine-Ruhr S-Bahn stations
Buildings and structures in Solingen
S7 (Rhine-Ruhr S-Bahn)
Railway stations in Germany opened in 2006